The Busan International Comedy Festival (BICF) is an annual comedy festival and cultural event held in Busan, South Korea. Since its establishment in 2013, the festival takes place for four days in late August to early September every year. 
The BICF includes comedic performances and acts from around the world, featuring sketch shows and stand-up acts. The festival has since grown from its 2013 debut; South Korean teams such as KBS's Gag Concert, SBS's Searching for Laughs and tvN's Comedy Big League are joined by a variety of teams from many different countries, such as the United Kingdom, South Africa, Japan and Italy. The festival is the largest international comedy festival in Asia and the first in South Korea.

The festival's shows are structured by first holding the opening gala, where invited comedians walk on a "blue carpet", a spin-off from the red carpets at film festivals. Over the course of four days, comedy acts perform in indoor theaters as well as outdoor venues.

The Busan International Comedy Festival Organizing Committee currently includes the honorary chairman Jeon Yu-seong, the executive chairman Kim Jun-ho and the vice-directors Choi Dae-woong, Cho Kwang-sik, and the board member Kim Dae-hee.

History 
The festival was launched on August 29, 2013 and was held through September 1. It was only held at the Hall of Busan Film, where it attracted 21,198 spectators through the next four days. The show featured 17 teams from 7 countries. As it was the first festival, head of the organizing committee and comedian Kim Jun ho stated, "Since this is the first festival, we're having some problems with the lodging and transportation and such. I'm sure it'll get better with future festivals."

The second festival was held from August 29 to September 1, 2014, under the slogan, "Smile is Hope". The opening gala was held at Busan Cinema Center, and the shows were held at Movies of Fame, KBS Hall, Ye-no Theater at Kyungsung University, Shinsegae Culture Hall, and Busan Citizen's Park Dasom Yard. Twelve teams from seven countries performed at the festival, attracting 26,865 audience members. On-gals and the Gag Concert team represented Korea, while Tape Face and Beky Hoop represented the UK and Canada. Moriyas Bangbangbigaro from Japan and 6D from Australia also performed.

The 3rd Busan International Comedy Festival was held from August 28 to August 31, 2015 with 13 shows under the conjoined slogan, "Busan sea of Laughter, Laughter is Hope (부산바다 웃음바다, 웃음이 희망이다)". The opening gala was held at Busan Cinema Center. While the international acts were performed at Ye-no Art Hall at Kyungsung University, domestic acts were performed at Theatre HAPPENING and Sasang Indie Station. Certain international and domestic acts congregated at the Comedy Open Concert, which was held outdoors at Busan Citizen's Park Dasom Yard, Haeundae Beach, and Gamman Creative Community Space. All in all, 28 teams from 12 countries performed at the festival. Comedians from different TV networks (KBS, MBC, SBS, tvN) participated in the event, as well as different acts from the United States, Britain, Australia, Canada, Germany, China, Japan, Taiwan, Malaysia, Switzerland, and Africa. Bunk Puppets of Canada, The Umbilical Brothers from Australia, The Street Circus from Canada and Montreux Comedy@Busan were part of the international comedy acts lineup. The event attracted more than 35,000 spectators.

The 9th Busan International Comedy Festival was held from August 20 to August 29, 2021.

The 10th Busan International Comedy Festival was held from August 19 to August 28, 2022. Kim Seong-won and Byun Ki-soo, hosted the opening ceremony at Busan Haeundae-gu Film Hall on 19 August.

Awards 
The festival currently presents three awards: Ocean of Busan Prize, Ocean of Laughter Award, and the Rookie Award. Since 2013, the Ocean of Busan Prize is awarded to the best domestic South Korean comedic act while the Ocean of Laughter Award is given to the best international comedic performance. In 2015, the rookie award was established, which was awarded to the best newcomer to comedy. Each prize consists of a trophy and ₩5 million, except for the rookie award, which awards ₩3 million.

Busan Sea Award

Sea of laughter

Rookie Award

Broadcast and sponsors 
Korea New Network (KNN) is the official sponsor and broadcaster for the festival. The festival is also sponsored by the Ministry of Culture, Sports, and Tourism as well as the Busan Metropolitan City. All sponsors can be found here: BICF Sponsors.

See also 
 Comedy festivals

References

External links 
 Official Website
 Official Facebook

Busan
Culture of Busan
Festivals established in 2013
2013 establishments in South Korea
Annual events in South Korea
Comedy festivals in South Korea
Festivals in Busan